Sair Khan (born 11 February 1988) is an English actress, known for playing the role of Alya Nazir in the ITV soap opera Coronation Street since 2014. In 2018, she competed in the ITV reality series I'm a Celebrity...Get Me Out of Here!.

Life and career
Khan was born in Leeds, West Yorkshire on 11 February 1988. She is English of Pakistani descent.  Khan attended the National Youth Theatre from the age of 17. She made her television debut in a one-off part as receptionist Nina Chopra in BBC medical soap opera Doctors in 2011. In June 2014, Khan made her first appearance as Alya Nazir in the ITV soap opera Coronation Street. She has remained a regular character on the show ever since. Khan received a nomination for Best Newcomer at the National Television Awards in 2015. On 12 November 2018, Khan was confirmed to be participating in the eighteenth series of I'm a Celebrity...Get Me Out of Here!. Khan was the third celebrity to be voted out on 3 December 2018.

Personal life
In 2019, Khan split from boyfriend Simon Lennon.

Filmography

References

External links

1988 births
21st-century English actresses
Actresses from Leeds
English soap opera actresses
English television actresses
English people of Pakistani descent
I'm a Celebrity...Get Me Out of Here! (British TV series) participants
Living people